PP-170 Lahore-XXVII is a Constituency of Provincial Assembly of Punjab.

General elections 2018

See also
 PP-169 Lahore-XXVI
 PP-171 Lahore-XXVIII

References

External links
 Election commission Pakistan's official website
 Awazoday.com check result
 Official Website of Government of Punjab

Provincial constituencies of Punjab, Pakistan